The 120 KRH 92 is a 120 mm mortar manufactured in Finland.

Due to major general Vilho Nenonen's initiative, Finland has built mortars since the early 1930s and although they have not been exported, the designs have been used in many countries. The largest technological transfer of Finnish mortar technology took place in the 1950s, when the technology was transferred to Israel for Soltam.

The mortar is used to support battalions and companies in battle with indirect fire, to give support fire for infantry troops and coastal fortifications, and to apply smoke or illumination on the battlefield. It is usually transported by vehicle and the maximum towing speed is 80 km/h. The mortar is operated by a seven-man crew.

Mortar has been observed in August 2022 in use in Ukraine as part of Ukrainian operations in Russo-Ukrainian War. Photos reveal 4 persons in crew. Their delivery was not announced by Finland.

Characteristics
Caliber: 120 mm
Weight:
 weight in operation 159 kg
 weight in transport 342 kg
Rate of fire: 15 shots/min
Range: 7.3 km (maximum effective range)
Ammunition types: HE-fragmentation, smoke, illumination and practice rounds
 weight of fragmentation grenade 12.8 kg
 muzzle velocity of mortar, largest shell 362 m/s
 Made in Finland

See also

 List of heavy mortars
 M120 120 mm mortar 120 mm mortar
 2B11 Sani 120 mm mortar
 2S12 Sani 120 mm mortar
 Cardom 120 mm recoil mortar system
 Soltam K6 120 mm mortar
 Soltam M-65 120 mm mortar
 120mm M2 RAIADO 120 mm mortar
 Mortier 120mm Rayé Tracté Modèle F1 120 mm mortar

References

Infantry mortars
120 mm artillery
Mortars of Finland
120mm mortars
Military equipment introduced in the 1990s